Kalmak-Ashuu is a village in the Kemin District of Chüy Region of Kyrgyzstan. Its population was 773 in 2021.

References

Populated places in Chüy Region